Myosin-1, also known as 'striated muscle myosin heavy chain 1', is a protein that in humans is encoded by the MYH1 gene.  This gene is most highly expressed in fast type IIX/D muscle fibres of vertebrates and encodes a protein found uniquely in striated muscle; it is a class II myosin with a long coiled coil tail that dimerizes and should not be confused with 'Myosin 1' encoded by the MYO1 family of genes (MYO1A-MYO1H). Class I MYO1 genes function in many cell types throughout biology and are single-headed membrane-binding myosins that lack a long coiled coil tail.

Function 

Myosin is a major contractile protein that converts chemical energy into mechanical energy through the hydrolysis of ATP. Class II Myosins are hexameric proteins composed of a pair of myosin heavy chains (MYH) and two pairs of nonidentical light chains. Myosin heavy chains are encoded by a multigene family. In mammals, at least ten different myosin heavy chain (MYH) isoforms have been described from striated, smooth, but rarely in non-muscle cells. These isoforms show expression that is spatially and temporally regulated during development.

References

Further reading